New York State Route 376 (NY 376) is a state highway located entirely within Dutchess County in the Hudson Valley region of New York in the United States. The route begins at an intersection with NY 52 in East Fishkill and passes north through Hopewell Junction and Red Oaks Mill on its way to the city of Poughkeepsie. It ends at a junction with U.S. Route 44 (US 44) and NY 55 east of the city limits in Arlington, a hamlet in the town of Poughkeepsie. NY 376 was originally designated as part of NY 39 in the mid-1920s. In the 1930 renumbering of state highways in New York, the East Fishkill–Poughkeepsie portion of NY 39 was renumbered to New York State Route 202. NY 202 was renumbered to NY 376 in 1935 to avoid numerical duplication with the new US 202.

Route description

NY 376 begins at an intersection with NY 52 in the hamlet of East Fishkill. NY 376 leaves NY 82 and continues northwest, crossing railroad tracks and following a sharp 90° S-curve with a  advisory speed. NY 376 passes by the Dogwood Knolls Country Club before meeting County Route 29 (CR 29) in the hamlet of Fishkill Plains, at which point NY 376 proceeds west.

Immediately after crossing from the town of East Fishkill into the town of Wappinger, NY 376 turns north at an intersection with CR 93. It continues north for about  through the hamlet of Diddell, where it turns west again towards the hamlet of New Hackensack. Here, the route meets CR 94 and CR 104. NY 376 turns north at this intersection, running along the eastern perimeter of and providing access to the passenger terminal of Dutchess County Airport. North of the airport, NY 376 runs closely parallel to Wappinger Creek, briefly entering the town limits of La Grange before crossing the Wappinger Creek into the town of Poughkeepsie.

In the Poughkeepsie hamlet of Red Oaks Mill, NY 376 meets the eastern end of NY 113 (Spackenkill Road) and the northern end of CR 77 (Vassar Road) at the center of the community. NY 376 approaches the intersection at a 45-degree angle, resulting in a series of sharp traffic movements between the three roads—the sharpest being the 135-degree turn between NY 376 northbound and Vassar Road southbound. Past the junction, NY 376 continues north on New Hackensack Road, the northward continuation of Vassar Road.

NY 376 follows Raymond Avenue for about a mile (1.6 km) to the hamlet of Arlington. Here, it meets US 44 and NY 55, both of which follow a one-way couplet along Haight Street (eastbound) and Maple Street (westbound) through the city of Poughkeepsie. In between the two streets, NY 376 intersects Main Street (CR 114). The route ends upon intersecting westbound US 44 and NY 55, at which point the routing of NY 376 becomes an unnumbered town road named Van Wagner Road.

History

Route designation

NY 376 was originally designated as part of NY 39, a route extending from Patterson to Poughkeepsie by way of West Patterson and East Fishkill, in the mid-1920s. In the 1930 renumbering of state highways in New York, NY 39 was reassigned to another highway in western New York while its former routing in the Hudson Valley was broken up into several routes. One of these was NY 202, a new route that began in East Fishkill and ended in Poughkeepsie. The rest of NY 39 became part of NY 52 from East Fishkill to the western fringe of Patterson, and NY 311 for the rest of the routing. In 1934, US 202 was designated by AASHO. US 202 signs did not get put up in New York until April 1, 1935. In order to avoid a numbering conflict, NY 202 was renumbered to NY 376 that day.

Roundabouts
In 2006, the New York State Department of Transportation (NYSDOT) converted NY 376's intersections with the main gate of Vassar College and College Avenue into roundabouts. Both of the roundabouts replaced traffic lights. A traffic signal used to control traffic for a pedestrian crosswalk was also removed as part of their construction. Another roundabout was constructed in 2008 at Fulton and Collegeview Avenues. NYSDOT has called the installation of roundabouts a success, stating that it has significantly calmed traffic, decreased congestion and increased traffic flow.

The construction of the roundabouts was controversial from the outset. The first two roundabouts were installed by NYSDOT even though both the town and city of Poughkeepsie declared that they were opposed to the roundabouts. Additionally, the roundabouts have drawn much controversy from local residents because they remove a lane of traffic in each direction, reducing Raymond Avenue (NY 376) from a four-lane road to a divided two-lane boulevard and significantly altering pre-existing traffic patterns. A moderate amount of traffic has diverted onto alternate local routes as a result. In response, NYSDOT installed traffic calming measures on these parallel roads prior to the construction of the Fulton Avenue roundabout.

Major intersections

See also

References

External links

376
Transportation in Dutchess County, New York